Long Hồ was also the name of the Vĩnh Long province of Vietnam before 1975.

Long Hồ is a rural district (huyện) of Vĩnh Long province, in the Mekong Delta region of Vietnam. As of 2003 the district had a population of 151,996. The district covers an area of 193 km². The district capital lies at Long Hồ.

References

Districts of Vĩnh Long province